Jacobo Hey Paoa is the first Rapa Nui male to earn a law degree and become an attorney.

Family 
His parents Urbano Edmunds Hey and Carolina Paoa Rangitopa were from Rapa-Nui. Urbano, who once served as the Mayor of Hanga Roa, was the son of Henry Percy Edmunds and Sofia Catalina Renga No'i No'i Hereveri Vaka. From 1904-1929, Edmunds was the manager of the Scottish-Chilean company Williamson Balfour Agency—a merchant of sheep raising and nitrates that created the Island Exploitation Company. In addition to Urbano, Edmunds also fathered Juan Edmunds Rapahango from a prior marriage. Rapahango was the father of politician Pedro Edmunds Paoa, and each would serve as the Mayor of Easter Island (Rapahango: 1973-1979, 1990-1992; Paoa: 1994-2008, 2012-ongoing).

Educational background and legal career 
At the age of thirteen, Jacobo Hey Paoa traveled from Easter Island and settled in Santiago, Chile. He had difficulty adjusting to his new life, as he did not speak Spanish and was enrolled at an experimental school that had unconventional teaching methods. Later, as an adult, Paoa himself entered the educational field. He graduated from the José Abelardo Núñez Higher Normal School as a Normalist Professor and eventually became the educational institution's director. In 1974, he began studying law at the University of Chile. He earned a Master's in Labor Law and Social Security—even receiving an exchange scholarship from the Rotary Club to study in Chicago, Illinois.

Political life 
By 1983, he returned to Easter Island. He served as the Provincial Governor from 1990 to 2000 during the governments of the center-left Concertación coalition until his resignation. He was instrumental in the preparation of the Indigenous Law 19.253 and its subsequent modification to restore land to the members of the Rapa Nui people. He currently serves as the Secretary of the Court, Notary and Conservator of Real Estate of the Island. In certain instances, he is even called upon to serve as an alternate or subrogated judge for the Easter Island Court.

References 

Year of birth missing (living people)
Living people
Easter Island people
University of Chicago alumni
University of Chile alumni
20th-century Chilean lawyers
21st-century Chilean judges